Events in the year 2016 in Estonia.

Incumbents
 President: Toomas Hendrik Ilves (until 10 October), Kersti Kaljulaid (starting 10 October)
 Prime Minister: Taavi Rõivas

October
Kersti Kaljulaid becomes the fifth president of Estonia.

Estonia in the Eurovision Song Contest 2016
July - 2016 Rally Estonia
August 5–21 - Estonian athletes competed at the 2016 Summer Olympics in Rio de Janeiro, Brazil

See also
 2016 in Estonian football
 2016 in Estonian television

References

 
2010s in Estonia
Years of the 21st century in Estonia
Estonia
Estonia